Tommy is a 1972 album by the London Symphony Orchestra, conducted by David Measham, performing arrangements by Wil Malone of The Who's 1969 album Tommy. The project was conceived by Lou Reizner, initially with Rod Stewart singing Roger Daltrey's main role. As Pete Townshend and Daltrey became more involved, Stewart's role was reduced to singing "Pinball Wizard".

The studio version of the orchestral Tommy was issued in boxed-set LP format. It featured original artwork and photography, which used a pinball as its main motif, was designed by Tom Wilkes and Craig Braun and won the Best Album Package Grammy in 1974. The art was by Richard Amsel, Robert Heindel, Jim Manos, Alex Gnidziejko, Wilson McLean, Doug Johnson, David Edward Byrd, Robert Grossman, Charles White III, Richard Harvey and Mark English.

Though it yielded no hit singles, the album fared well on Billboard's Top Pop Albums chart, debuting on 9 December 1972, peaking at #5, and remaining on the chart for 38 weeks.

Track list

Guest soloists in order of appearance 
Narrator: Pete Townshend
Nurse: Sandy Denny
Lover: Graham Bell
Father: Steve Winwood
Mother: Maggie Bell
Hawker: Richie Havens
Acid Queen: Merry Clayton
Tommy: Roger Daltrey
Cousin Kevin: John Entwistle
Uncle Ernie: Ringo Starr
Local Lad: Rod Stewart
Doctor: Richard Harris

Charts

References

1970s classical albums
London Symphony Orchestra albums
Ode Records albums
Tommy (rock opera)